Parchi Kola may refer to:
 Parchi Kola, Qaem Shahr
 Parchi Kola, Sari